Paragons may refer to:

 Paragons (comics), one of the teams of mutants in the comic book series New X-Men: Academy X
 The Paragons, a Jamaican rocksteady band
 The Paragons (Charlotte band), an American 1960s garage rock band
 The Paragons, an American 1950s doo-wop group on Winley Records

See also
 Paragon (disambiguation)